Michael Kang, (born May 13, 1971, South Korea) is a multi-instrumentalist for the jam band The String Cheese Incident (often abbreviated to SCI).

The mandolin is his primary instrument, although he plays violin on several songs, and electric mandolin on many others. He provides both a melodic and rhythmic sound. Kang has lived in South Korea, Indonesia, England, Germany, New York City, San Francisco Bay Area (California), United Arab Emirates, Alaska, and Colorado. He is a graduate of UC-Berkeley, a former emergency medical technician, and a former ski patrolman in Steamboat Springs, CO.

Side projects
In addition to his role in SCI, Kang has participated in several side projects, among these was the 2000 album Head West by the collaboration called Comotion. Musicians joining Kang in the studio included Jeff Sipe and Tye North of Leftover Salmon, progressive bluegrass musicians Paul McCandless, Darol Anger, and Mike Marshall, and drummer Aaron Johnson. He also can be found playing with the band Panjea and with Chris Berry.

References

External links

American musicians of Korean descent
Living people
1971 births
Columbia Records artists
The String Cheese Incident members